2001 in Ghana details events of note that happened in Ghana in the year 2001.

Incumbents
 President: John Kufuor
 Vice President: John Atta Mills (until 7 January) Aliu Mahama
 Chief Justice: Isaac Kobina Abban (until 21 April) Edward Kwame Wiredu

Events

January
7th - John Kufuor inaugurated as President of Ghana. Kufuor had won the 2000 Presidential elections.

February

March
6 March - 44th independence anniversary is held

April

May
9th - 126 football supporters die at the Accra Sports Stadium.

June
President Kufour abolishes the celebration of the June 4th revolution anniversary.

July
1st - Republic day celebrations held.

August

September

October

November

December
 Annual Farmers' Day celebrations held across the country.

National holidays
Holidays in italics are "special days", while those in regular type are "regular holidays".
 January 1: New Year's Day
 March 6: Independence Day
 May 1: Labor Day
 December 25: Christmas
 December 26: Boxing Day

In addition, several other places observe local holidays, such as the foundation of their town. These are also "special days."

References

 
Years of the 21st century in Ghana
Ghana
2000s in Ghana
Ghana